Boncourt may refer to:

places in France:
Boncourt, Aisne, in the Aisne département
Boncourt, Eure, in the Eure département 
Boncourt, Eure-et-Loir, in the Eure-et-Loir département
Boncourt, Meurthe-et-Moselle, in the Meurthe-et-Moselle département 
Boncourt-le-Bois, in the Côte-d'Or département 
Boncourt-sur-Meuse, in the Meuse département
Boncourt, Switzerland, a municipality in the Canton of Jura, Switzerland
Boncourt (chess player), a 19th-century French chess player
Basket-club Boncourt, a basketball team in Switzerland